Barcelona (meaning Cross at Trelawne) is a hamlet in the parish of Pelynt in south-east Cornwall, England, UK.

Geography
Barcelona is a hamlet, in south-east Cornwall, on the A387 road, between Polperro and Looe.

History
Trelawne Manor (meaning farm of the elm tree) lies immediately north of Barcelona and was formerly the ancestral home of the Trelawney family (a Cornish family tracing back to the Medevial period). It is now a leisure complex and holiday park.

Sport
Pelynt Football Club played their home matches at Barcelona and had named their ground "the New Camp", due to having the same name as FC Barcelona of Spain who play at the Camp Nou. The club was named after the nearby village of Pelynt and was a founder member of the Duchy League. They folded in July 2019 after withdrawing from the Duchy League.

See also
 Pelynt
 Sir Jonathan Trelawny, 3rd Baronet

References

External links

Hamlets in Cornwall